Winchmore Hill Police Station is a former police station, designed by John Dixon Butler. It is located at 687 Green Lanes in Winchmore Hill, London. It is a grade II listed building with Historic England.

References

External links

http://www.inst.knightfrank.com/documents/fetch/4984
http://www.enfieldindependent.co.uk/news/8334708.Armed_police_called_after_Winchmore_Hill_shooting/
http://www.enfieldindependent.co.uk/news/localnews/10161130.Public__already_chosen__which_police_stations_to_close/?ref=rl

Former Metropolitan Police stations
Grade II listed buildings in the London Borough of Enfield
Winchmore Hill
Defunct police stations